Naohito (written: 直人) is a masculine Japanese given name. Notable people with the name include:

, Japanese actor and singer
, Japanese footballer
Naohito Ishii (born 1963), Japanese taekwondo practitioner 

Japanese masculine given names